The Purdue State Bank Building is a historic structure in West Lafayette, Indiana, United States, designed by American architect and Frank Lloyd Wright's mentor Louis Sullivan. Completed in 1914, the bank is the smallest and least expensive of Sullivan's "Jewel Boxes", a series of Midwestern banks designed in the modern style at the end of his career. Built on a tiny, trapezoidal lot between two streets, the structure is less ornamental than most of the architect's other work, including only a few terra cotta panels. The building cost $14,600 to be constructed, of which only about 10% was paid to Sullivan, barely covering his expenses. A local paper at the time referred to Sullivan as "one of the most noted bank architects in the United States". 

During the 1950s, a stone portion was added to the back of the building and the original doorway was converted into a window and then an ATM. The building is located one block from Purdue University and currently houses a branch of Chase bank.

References

External links

Louis Sullivan buildings
Bank buildings in Indiana
Buildings and structures completed in 1914
Buildings and structures in Tippecanoe County, Indiana
West Lafayette, Indiana
Art Nouveau architecture in Indiana
Art Nouveau commercial buildings